Luvhengo Mungomeni (born 18 February 1985) is a South African former soccer player who played as a defender. He played club football for Bush Bucks, Black Leopards, Mamelodi Sundowns and Moroka Swallows and international football for South Africa.

References

External links

1985 births
Living people
People from Makhado Local Municipality
South African soccer players
Bush Bucks F.C. players
Association football central defenders
Association football fullbacks
Mamelodi Sundowns F.C. players
Black Leopards F.C. players
Moroka Swallows F.C. players
South Africa international soccer players
Sportspeople from Limpopo